Gagea antakiensis, commonly known as the Antakya gagea, is a flowering plant in the family Liliaceae. It is endemic to Turkey. It is classified as critically endangered by the International Union for Conservation of Nature.

Distribution 
It is found in Turkey.

Taxonomy 
It was described by Nermin Kayikci, Atila Ocak and Mehtap Tekşen in: Phytotaxa 170: 270 in 2014.

References

External links 

antakiensis
Critically endangered flora of Asia